Paul von Rusdorf (c. 1385 - 1441) was the 29th Grand Master of the Teutonic Knights, serving from 1422 to 1441.

The Treaty of Melno was one of von Rusdorf's first acts; it brought stability to the Order and its relations, but fighting resumed in 1431 with the Polish-Teutonic War (1431-1435). Johannes von Baysen (Jan Bażyński) was one of his ambassadors.

External links 
Hochmeister Paul von Rusdorf

References
 Friedrich Borchert: "Die Hochmeister des Deutschen Ordens in Preußen." In: Preußische Allgemeine Zeitung, 6 October 2001.

Grand Masters of the Teutonic Order
German untitled nobility
1441 deaths
Year of birth unknown